Noth is a commune in the Creuse department in the Nouvelle-Aquitaine region in central France.

Geography

Population

Sights
 The thirteenth-century church, with a fortified tower.
 An ancient stone cross.
 The Lac de la Cazine, a  lake.
 The château de la Cazine at La Fôt.

See also
Communes of the Creuse department

References

Communes of Creuse